Las Heras is a  department located in the north west of Mendoza Province in Argentina.

The province's international airport, Governor Francisco Gabrielli International Airport is located within this subdivision.

Name 

The Partido and its capital are named after General Juan Gregorio de las Heras (1780-1866), a military leader during the Argentine War of Independence.

Districts 

 Cieneguita
 El Algarrobal
 El Borbollón
 El Challao
 El Pastal
 El Plumerillo
 El Resguardo
 El Zapallar
 Las Cuevas 
 Las Heras
 Panquehua
 Punta de Vacas
 Uspallata

Geography 

The mountains of the Andes act as a natural border between Argentina and Chile, the mountain range forms much of the western part of the department of Las heras.

Mount Aconcagua is located in Las Heras Department, at 6,962 metres above sea level it holds many records, including:

 The highest mountain in South America.
 The Highest Mountain in all of the Americas.
 The highest mountain in the Southern Hemisphere.
 The highest mountain outside of the continent of Asia.

The people of Las Heras are proud to have such an important mountain in their department, and as one of the Seven Summits it brings a great number of mountaineers and sightseers to the region.

External links

Municipal Site
Tourist Information (Spanish)

1871 establishments in Argentina
Departments of Mendoza Province